John Perumbalath (born 1966) is a bishop in the Church of England who has served as Bishop of Liverpool since 2023. He had previously served as area Bishop of Bradwell (2018–2023) and Archdeacon of Barking (2013–2018), both in the Diocese of Chelmsford. Perumbalath comes from the ancient Christian community in Kerala, South India. He moved to north India for higher studies and then teaching. He was ordained in the Church of North India in 1994. As Bishop of Bradwell he has oversight of 182 churches in an area covering mid and south Essex consisting of six boroughs/District Councils (Brentwood, Basildon, Rochford, Castle Point, Chelmsford, and Maldon) and two unitary authorities (Thurrock and Southend). In October 2022, it was announced that Elizabeth II had, before her death, approved his appointment as Bishop of Liverpool.

Education
Perumbalath was educated at Calicut University, Chelari (Kerala), Osmania University, Hyderabad (Telangana) where he obtained his graduate and postgraduate degrees in political science and philosophy.

During his university days, Perumbalath was active in literary and debating areas. He won first prizes in short story, essay and poem writing at Calicut University arts festivals. He represented St Mary's College, Sulthan Bathery at various elocution and speech competitions in Kerala and won many prizes for the college. He also graduated with distinction and first rank in the university. 

He was a seminarian at the Union Biblical Seminary, Pune (Maharashtra) and later at the North India Institute of Post Graduate Theological Studies, Calcutta/Serampore (West Bengal) where he pursued specialized postgraduate research in New Testament.  He also pursued doctoral studies in hermeneutics at King's College London and North-West University.

Career
Perumbalath worked among university students as a staff worker of the Evangelical Union for two years in his home state Kerala before doing his post-graduate research in theology at the North India Institute of Post Graduate Theological Studies, Calcutta / Serampore specializing in New Testament. Then he joined the faculty of Serampore College as Lecturer in New Testament. He was ordained deacon in 1994 and priest in 1995 in the diocese of Calcutta (Church of North India). After a short curacy at St John's Church, Calcutta, in 1995 he was appointed Vicar of St. James' Church, Kolkata. After moving to the UK in 2001, he served at Beckenham St George's as Associate Rector, at Rosherville St Mark's as Priest-in-Charge/Team Vicar and at Northfleet All Saints (all in the Diocese of Rochester) as Vicar before his appointment as Archdeacon of Barking, a newly created post. He was the chair of North Kent Council for Inter-faith Relations from 2008 to 2013. From 2008 to 2013, he was also the Diocese of Rochester's Urban Adviser and Link Officer for the Church Urban Fund. He was collated as Archdeacon of Barking on 15 September 2013 with the oversight of the Anglican churches in the London Boroughs of Barking & Dagenham and Havering. He was consecrated as bishop by Archbishop Justin Welby on 3 July 2018 at St Paul's Cathedral and was installed at Chelmsford Cathedral on 22 July. 

Perumbalath was a Proctor in Convocation (member of the House of Clergy) of the General Synod of the Church of England: for the Diocese of Rochester, elected in 2010 and serving until his move to Barking in 2013; and for the Diocese of Chelmsford from the 2015 election until his consecration. He was a trustee of USPG, an international mission society of the Church of England, from 2009 to 2014.  He was the chair of the Committee for Minority Ethnic Anglican Concerns (CMEAC) and sat on the Appointment Committee of the Church of England. He was also a member of the Mission and Public Affairs Council of the Church of England. Perumbalath also chaired the London Churches Refugee Network, the ecumenical body that brings together various Christian responses supporting refugees and their rights. He also served on the Methodist Anglican Panel for Mission and Unity (MAPUM) and London Faith Sector Panel. Currently he is the Chair of Churches Refugee Network of Churches Together in Britain and Ireland. He serves on the Faith and Order Commission and the Clergy Discipline Commission of the Church of England. He is Church of England's Lead Bishop on Churches Together in Britain and Ireland relations and a trustee of CTBI. He chairs Christians Aware, an educational charity and serves on the Anglican Communion wide Advisory Group of USPG, an Anglican mission society. He lectures widely on Faith and social engagement and in Biblical theology.

Bishop of Liverpool
On 25 November 2022, Perumbalath was elected by the College of Canons of Liverpool Cathedral to become the next Bishop of Liverpool. The confirmation of his election — by which he legally took up the See of Liverpool — was the 20 January 2023 at York Minster.

Theological positions
Perumbalath demonstrates the influence of the evangelical, Anglo-Catholic and Oriental Orthodox traditions that shaped his theology and contributed to his formation. He trained for ordination at the Union Biblical Seminary Pune, the leading evangelical theological college in India. He follows a Benedictine framework of spirituality. He has served in catholic and evangelical parishes and has been known as a unifying leader in situations of conflict. Theologically he belongs to the Post-Critical tradition and is influenced by George Lindbeck, Walter Brueggemann and Richard B. Hays.

In January 2023, Perumbalath stated that he is "praying that we would be able to at least bless the same sex civil marriages and rescind 'the Issues in Human Sexuality'"

Styles and titles
The Reverend John Perumbalath (1994–2007)
The Reverend Doctor John Perumbalath (2007–2013)
The Venerable Doctor John Perumbalath (2013–2018)
The Right Reverend Doctor John Perumbalath (2018–present)

Personal life
Perumbalath is married to Jessy, a teacher in London and they have one daughter.

References

1966 births
Living people
University of Calicut alumni
Osmania University alumni
Alumni of King's College London
North-West University alumni
Archdeacons of Barking
Bishops of Bradwell
21st-century Church of England bishops
Academic staff of the Senate of Serampore College (University)
Senate of Serampore College (University) alumni
Union Biblical Seminary, Pune alumni